Kahtuiyeh (also Romanized as Kahtū’īyeh) is a village in Jowzam Rural District, Dehaj District, Shahr-e Babak County, Kerman Province, Iran. At the 2006 census, its population was 178, in 47 families.

References 

Populated places in Shahr-e Babak County